The St. Lucie Legends was one of the eight original baseball franchises that played in the Senior Professional Baseball Association in 1989. The club played its home games at the then recently inaugurated Thomas J. White Stadium, located in Port St. Lucie, Florida.

The Legends featured players such as Vida Blue, a former American League MVP and Cy Young Award winner, as well as National League MVP George Foster and perennial All-Stars Bobby Bonds and Graig Nettles, who signed on as player-manager. Nevertheless, the Legends were an awful team that lost 20 of their first 23 games, which cost Nettles his manager's post, being replaced by Bonds for the remainder of the season.

The Legends finished the season with an overall record of 20–51 and did not make the playoffs. Juan Beníquez led the team with a .359 batting average, while Willie Aikens and Foster belted 11 home runs apiece.

In addition, the Legends had severe financial struggles while averaging only 607 fans for 36 home games. The club folded shortly thereafter.

Notable players

Willie Aikens
Juan Beníquez
Vida Blue 
Bobby Bonds
Don Cooper 
John D'Acquisto 
George Foster
Oscar Gamble
Ed Glynn
Fernando Gonzalez
Ross Grimsley
Jerry Grote 
Don Gullett
Dave Hilton
Al Holland
Joe Horlen
Clint Hurdle
Jerry Johnson
Von Joshua
Bill Madlock
Jerry Manuel 
Larry Milbourne  
Félix Millán
Tom Murphy 
Ivan Murrell
Randy Niemann
Graig Nettles
Jim Nettles  
Sergio Ferrer  
Steve Ontiveros
Floyd Rayford
Fred Stanley 
Roy Thomas
Luis Tiant
Jackson Todd
Bill Travers
Walt Williams

Sources

Defunct baseball teams in Florida
Senior Professional Baseball Association teams
St. Lucie County, Florida
1989 establishments in Florida
1989 disestablishments in Florida
Baseball teams established in 1989
Sports clubs disestablished in 1989